Celestial Clockwork is the third solo studio album by American rapper Illogic. It was released by Weightless Recordings on April 13, 2004. The production is entirely handled by Blueprint. It features vocal contributions from Aesop Rock, Vast Aire, Slug, and Blueprint.

Critical reception
Dominic Umile of PopMatters gave the album a favorable review, saying, "Celestial Clockworks mystifying backdrop is an example of Blueprint's ability to hold back as a producer when necessary, but is also an expansive assortment of psychedelic beats that naturally complement Illogic's sly, off-kilter approach."

Alex Henderson of AllMusic gave the album 3 stars out of 5, saying, "Illogic is one of rap's intellectuals, and the heritage that he brings to the table -- influences like De La Soul, Q-Tip, and Common -- makes for a more nuanced, lyrically complex hip-hop experience."

Track listing

References

External links
 
 Celestial Clockwork at Bandcamp

2004 albums
Illogic albums